Hall Hill Farm is a tourist attraction located in County Durham, near Tow Law, England.

History
Ann Darlington is the current tourism manager at Hall Hill Farm. Her grandparents came to the farm in 1925, and now her brother David Gibson runs the working farm.
Hall Hill Farm opened to the public in 1981 after Ann and David's father, Jack Gibson, suggested allowing the public to see the farm's lambs, following an interest over that Easter period.

Site

The animals available for the public to see include llamas, wallabies and Highland cattle. There are also more traditional creatures; chicks, lambs, pigs, donkeys, ponies and rabbits.

References

External links
Hall Hill Farm website

1981 establishments in England

Farms in England
Tourist attractions in County Durham